ABC Color is a major Paraguayan newspaper with offices in the city of Asunción.

The editorial that publishes the newspaper (Azeta) was founded August 8, 1967 by Aldo Zuccolillo. It is one of the most widely read daily newspapers in Paraguay. In its formative years, ABC Color supported Stroessner's autocratic regime. During the founding event of the newspaper, Zuccolillo declared this is "a great newspaper serving a great government".

However, in the late 1970s and during the 1980s, ABC Color took a more critical position, which caused the forced suspension of the newspaper from 1984 until the end of Stroessner's dictatorship, in 1989.

External links
 ABC Color

ABC Color
ABC Color
Newspapers established in 1967